Wehrwolf may refer to:

 Der Wehrwolf, a novel by Hermann Löns, published in 1910
 Werwolf, a Nazi plan, to create a resistance forces behind enemy lines
 Werwolf (Wehrmacht headquarters), one of Adolf Hitler's military headquarters, located in Ukraine
 An archaic spelling of werewolf, a human with the ability to shapeshift into a wolf